Laszlo Halasz (6 June 1905 in Debrecen – 26 October 2001 in Port Washington, New York) was an American opera director, conductor, and pianist of Hungarian birth. In 1943 he was appointed the first director of the New York City Opera, a position he held through 1951. He later served on music faculties of the Peabody Conservatory of Music and the Eastman School of Music as part of their conducting and opera departments. He was married to the cellist Suzette Forgues Halasz for more than 50 years.

Sources
Opera News Obituary
New York Times Obituary

External links
Profile of Laszlo Halasz at The Remington Site
Interview with Laszlo Halasz, November 28, 1987

1905 births
2001 deaths
American male conductors (music)
Hungarian emigrants to the United States
Eastman School of Music faculty
Johns Hopkins University faculty
American opera directors
American music educators
People from Port Washington, New York
20th-century American pianists
American male pianists
20th-century American conductors (music)
20th-century American male musicians